Wandi may refer to:

 Wandi, Western Australia, Australia
 Wandi, Shandong (万第镇), town in Laiyang, Shandong, China
 Olga Miller (1920–2003), Australian historian, artist, author and Aboriginal elder whose traditional name was Wandi